Aborlan, officially the Municipality of Aborlan,  is a 1st class municipality in the province of , Philippines. According to the 2020 census, it has a population of 38,736 people.

Aborlan became a municipality on June 28, 1949, by Executive Order No. 232. In 1951, the municipality lost the barrios of Berong and Alfonso XII when those were transferred to the newly created town of Quezon.

Aborlan is the province's only town with an agricultural college, now called Western Philippines University. It was founded in 1910.

Geography

Barangays
Aborlan is politically subdivided into 19 barangays.

Climate

Demographics

Economy

References

External links
Aborlan Profile at PhilAtlas.com
[ Philippine Standard Geographic Code]
Philippine Census Information
Local Governance Performance Management System

Municipalities of Palawan
Establishments by Philippine executive order